William Schuyler Jackson (died November 23, 1932 in Jamaica, Queens, New York City) was an American lawyer and politician.

Biography
Jackson was the son of D. G. Jackson, a lawyer from Tonawanda, NY.
In 1892, he married a daughter of Buffalo shoe dealer T. B. Staley. They had two children.

He was First Assistant District Attorney of Erie County when he was elected New York State Attorney General on the Democratic and the Independence League tickets in November 1906. In February 1907, when he was just a month in office, his wife retained Edward E. Coatsworth (the former law partner of William F. Sheehan, Charles F. Tabor and John Cunneen) and announced she would sue for divorce. Two days later, they reconciled.

In 1920, he sent a letter to Governor Al Smith, protesting against the expulsion of five Socialist members (among them Louis Waldman and Sam Dewitt) from the New York State Assembly.

Sources
JACKSON TO ENFORCE LAW. - Will Deal Rigidly with Trusts and Persons Who Violate It., The AG elect, in NYT on November 8, 1906
JACKSON DISTRIBUTES OFFICES TO DEMOCRATS - Frank White His First Assistant, C.A. Dolson the Second. A HEARST MAN RECOGNIZED W.A. De Ford Gets a $4,000 Place -- Six Lawyers in Buffalo Also Get Plums. His appointments, in NYT on December 25, 1906
THE ATTORNEY GENERAL TO BE SUED FOR DIVORCE - Mrs. Jackson Says She Found Evidence in Rochester. RETAINS MR. COATESWORTH Mr. Jackson Quoted as Saying He Will "Get Even" with Former Superior -- Silent on Suit. The suit for divorce announced, in NYT on February 6, 1907
THE JACKSONS RECONCILED. - Attorney General's Wife Has Abandoned Divorce Suit She Planned. The reconciliation, in NYT on February 8, 1907
PROTESTS TO GOVERNOR. - W.S. Jackson, Former Attorney General, Criticises Assembly's Action. His letter to al Smith, in NYT on January 24, 1920
 Political Graveyard
 List of New York Attorneys General, at Office of the NYSAG

External links
[] Photo

Year of birth missing
1932 deaths
New York State Attorneys General
Politicians from Buffalo, New York
New York (state) Democrats
United States Independence Party politicians
Lawyers from Buffalo, New York